The 1968 Temple Owls football team was an American football team that represented Temple University as a member of the Middle Atlantic Conference (MAC) during the 1968 NCAA College Division football season. In its ninth season under head coach George Makris, the team compiled a 4–6 record (2–2 against MAC opponents). The team played its home games at Temple Stadium in Philadelphia.

Schedule

References

Temple
Temple Owls football seasons
Temple Owls football